Tolpia andamani is a moth of the family Erebidae first described by Michael Fibiger in 2007. It is known from the Andaman Islands in the Indian Ocean.

The wingspan is about 13 mm. The underside is unicolorous brown.

References

Micronoctuini
Taxa named by Michael Fibiger
Moths described in 2007